Mutanda Kwesele (born March 14, 1986 in Mufulira) is a Zambian footballer.

Career

Youth and college
Kwesele moved from his native Zambia to the United States with his family as a child, settling in Seattle, Washington. He attended Seattle Preparatory School, where he was a two-time All-Metro and All-District selection, and began his college soccer at Santa Clara University. He transferred to Seattle University prior to his sophomore season in 2006, and played three seasons with the Redhawks, helping the team reach the NCAA tournament in back-to-back seasons in 2006 and 2007. He played in 42 games during his college career, recording two goals and five assists.

During his college years Kwesele also played with the Tacoma Tide in the USL Premier Development League in 2007, playing in 10 games and scoring 1 goal.

Professional
Undrafted out of college, Kwesele was unable to secure a professional contract, and signed instead to play with the Portland Timbers U23s in the USL Premier Development League in 2009.

He signed his first professional contract in 2011 when he signed with FC Edmonton of the North American Soccer League.

He made his debut for Edmonton on May 4, 2011, in a 1-0 loss to Toronto FC in the 2011 Nutrilite Canadian Championship. The club released Kwesele on October 12, 2011 after the conclusion of the 2011 season.

Coaching 
Mutanda has coached for several Seattle-area clubs, organizations and schools.  He is currently a coach with Emerald City Football Club, and has coached for Rainier Beach High School.  Mutanda is also founder of The Rising Point, a non-profit organization designed to bring quality soccer programs to underserved communities.

References

External links
 FC Edmonton bio
 Seattle University bio

1986 births
Living people
Zambian footballers
Santa Clara Broncos men's soccer players
Seattle Redhawks men's soccer players
FC Edmonton players
Portland Timbers U23s players
Seattle Sounders FC U-23 players
USL League Two players
North American Soccer League players
Expatriate soccer players in the United States
Expatriate soccer players in Canada
Association football midfielders
People from Mufulira
Soccer players from Washington (state)